Nevine Hafez (born 3 August 1968) is an Egyptian swimmer. She competed in two events at the 1984 Summer Olympics. She was the first woman to represent Egypt at the Olympics.

References

External links
 

1968 births
Living people
Egyptian female swimmers
Olympic swimmers of Egypt
Swimmers at the 1984 Summer Olympics
Place of birth missing (living people)
20th-century Egyptian women
21st-century Egyptian women